Sweden held its 2009 European Parliament election to nominate Sweden's 18 members of the European Parliament on 7 June 2009. The election was held in the same week as 26 other member states.

Results

Results by county
The Swedish results are counted by county only, since the seats are shared on a national basis, rendering eight fewer counting areas than in Riksdag elections.

Percentage share

Percentage share

Municipal results

Blekinge

Dalarna

Gotland

Gävleborg

Halland

Jämtland

Jönköping

Kalmar

Kronoberg

Norrbotten

Skåne

Stockholm

Södermanland

Uppsala

Värmland

Västerbotten

Västernorrland

Västmanland

Västra Götaland

Örebro

Östergötland

References

2009 results
2009 elections in Sweden